Richland is an unincorporated community in Holmes County, Mississippi, located approximately  northwest of Goodman and approximately  north of Pickens.

History
A post office operated under the name Richland from 1842 to 1906. In 1900, Richland was home to a church and academy. The Richland Male and Female Academy was opened prior to 1839 and was superseded by the Eureka Masonic College in 1848. The Academy could accommodate 130 pupils.

The Eureka Masonic College
Historic Eureka Masonic College, birthplace of the Order of the Eastern Star (OES), is located along Highway 17, in the unincorporated community of Richland. The historic schoolhouse has also housed Masons and Company C, 15th Mississippi Infantry, of the Confederate States Army, during the American Civil War.

Presentation of Colors (1863)
The 1st Mississippi Cavalry, of the Confederate States Army, was presented with its regimental colors on September 12, 1863, a gift of the ladies of Richland.

Notable people
Blues musician Elmore James was born in Richland on January 27, 1918.

See also

 National Register of Historic Places listings in Holmes County, Mississippi

References

External links

 

Richland (Holmes County)
Richland (Holmes County), Mississippi
Richland
Richland (Holmes County)